Diva – The Hits (Hebrew: דיווה - האוסף, Diva - HaOsef lit. "Diva - The Collection") is a greatest hits album by Israeli singer Dana International, released on the IMP Dance label in 1998 with the catalogue number IMP 2048.

The compilation includes Dana International's winning entry of the Eurovision Song Contest 1998 in Birmingham, "Diva", along with some of her best-known songs and a few new recordings and remixes.

This compilation album was released in Israel only.

Track listing
Note: The album cover only lists titles in Hebrew script where applicable as well as the time lengths. Most editions include a sticker on the opposite side showing Latin transcriptions of the titles (but not English translations). The language in which the songs are sung and the English translations of the song titles are listed here for informational purposes only. The same applies for remix and radio edit notifications.

"Diva" (Hebrew Version) - 3:00
"Yeshnan Banot" (Hebrew; "Some Girls") - 2:33
"Don Quixote" (Hebrew) - 4:05
"Ani Lo Yekhola Bil'adeikha" (Hebrew; "I Can't Live Without You") (Radio Edit) - 4:14
"Maganona" (Arabic; "Crazy") (1998 remix) - 4:16
Sa'ida Sultana" (Arabic; "My Name Is Not Saida") (Album Edit) - 4:37
"Dana International" (Arabic) (Remix Edit) - 3:24
"Nosa'at LePet'ra" (Hebrew; "Going to Petra") - 3:39
"Fata Morgana" (Hebrew) - 4:42
"Layla T'ov, Eiropa" (Hebrew; "Good Evening, Europe") (Original Version) - 3:00
"Menafnefet" (Hebrew; "Waving") (Radio Edit) - 4:15
"100% Gever (Mea Akhuz Gever)" (Hebrew; "100% Man (One Hundred Percent Man)") - 3:21
"Shir Qdam-Shnati (Sex Acher)" (Hebrew; "Pre-Bed Song (A Different Kind of Sex)") (with 'Eran Tzur - Offer Nissim Remix) - 4:32
"Power" (English) (Radio Mix) - 4:05
"Cinque Milla" (Italian/English; "Five Thousand") (New Mix) - 4:53
"Zemer Shalosh HaTshuvot" (Hebrew; "Three Answers' Song") - 3:42
"Ani Lo Yekhola Bil'adeikha" (Hebrew; "I Can't Live Without You") (Acoustic Version) - 4:14

External links
 Official Dana International site with discography details
 Unofficial Dana International site with discography details
 Rateyourmusic.com discography
 Discogs.com discography

Dana International albums
1998 greatest hits albums